Berezov Pochinok is a rural locality (a village) in Pelshemskoye Rural Settlement, Sokolsky District, Vologda Oblast, Russia. The population was 2 as of 2002.

Geography 
The distance to Sokol is 45 km, to Markovskoye is 10 km. Dikoye is the nearest rural locality.

References 

Rural localities in Sokolsky District, Vologda Oblast